Turakina may refer to:

Turakina River, New Zealand
Turakina, New Zealand, an old Maori settlement
Töregene Khatun, wife of Ögedei Khan and regent of the Mongol Empire 1241–1246